Pi Arae, Latinized from π Arae, is the Bayer designation for a star in the southern constellation of Ara. It is faintly visible to the naked eye with an apparent visual magnitude of +5.25. Based upon an annual parallax shift of 46.30 mas as seen from Earth, it is located 70 light years from the Sun. It is most likely moving closer to the Sun with a radial velocity of −3 km/s.

The stellar classification of this star is A5 IV-V, indicating the spectrum displays the hybrid features of both a main sequence and a more evolved subgiant star. Pi Arae is an estimated 319 million years old and is spinning with a projected rotational velocity of 54.1 km/s. The star has 1.73 times the mass of the Sun and 1.90 times the Sun's radius. It is radiating 13.3 times the Sun's luminosity from its photosphere at an effective temperature of about 8,215 K.

Pi Arae displays an excess emission of infrared radiation, which may be explained by circumstellar dust. The thermal emission matches a two component model, consisting of an inner disk of warm crystalline silicate dust and an outer colder disk of dirty ice. The inner disk has a temperature of 173 K and is orbiting roughly 9.1 AU from the host star. The outer disk is 77 K and orbits at a distance of about 117.3 AU. The small size of some of the dust grains indicate the inner disk may have formed relatively recently from collisions between orbiting planetesimals.

Located 55 arc minutes to the north of Pi Arae is the globular cluster NGC 6397.

References

External links
 GJ 683
 Simbad
 Image Pi Arae

A-type main-sequence stars
A-type subgiants
Circumstellar disks
Arae, Pi
Ara (constellation)
Durchmusterung objects
0683
159492
086305
6549